Sin is a fictional comic book character appearing in books published by DC Comics. She first appeared in Birds of Prey #92 (May 2006), and was created by Gail Simone (writer) and Paulo Siqueira (artist).

Sin appeared as a recurring character on The CW Arrowverse show Arrow, played by Bex Taylor-Klaus.

Fictional character biography
Sin was introduced when Black Canary made a deal with Lady Shiva. They would switch lives for a year, in which Dinah would train as Lady Shiva had done, while Shiva herself took her position with Oracle and the Birds of Prey. During Dinah's training, she arrived at a village in Asia, which was ruled by a martial arts master known simply as Mother. Dinah was allowed to be trained by the cruel matriarch, though it often came as horrible mental and physical abuse.

While there, Dinah met a little girl dubbed Sin (the name may have been created to dehumanize Sin; while training there, Dinah was given the name "Tag", meaning "swine"). Sin was being groomed to become the next Lady Shiva, following the death of the current one. Sin and Dinah developed an immediate bond that bordered on sister and mother/daughter. When Dinah grew tired of Mother and her training, she decided to leave, and take Sin with her. Mother attempted to stop her, but was no match for Black Canary.

Returning to Metropolis with Sin, Dinah introduced Sin to her friends in the Birds of Prey, who all took a shine to the girl. They began to teach her the wonders of the western world and educate her in English and name-calling (she on occasion addressed Helena as "Spinster"). Over time Dinah began to question her life as member of the Birds of Prey, now that she had a child to care for. After several missions, she decided to leave the team so as to raise Sin full-time. This would prove difficult after Dinah rejoined the Justice League.

In the Black Canary miniseries, the League of Assassins attempts to kidnap Sin, seeing the martial arts prodigy as a messiah that could unite their splintered and then-leaderless group. In an attempt to save Sin from the League, Green Arrow fakes the child's death. Though the decision pains him, he conceals the truth from Dinah so that her grief will be real and convincing to their enemies. Dinah later learns of her foster daughter's survival.

Sin lives in a secluded monastery, to keep her safe from the League of Assassins and others who would exploit her intuitive gift for the martial arts. Black Canary makes occasional trips to visit her, still playing the role of mother part-time.

In other media

Television
Sin appears in season 2 of Arrow portrayed by Bex Taylor-Klaus. In the show, she is a streetwise Caucasian teenager instead of Chinese from the Glades, a slum in Starling City, who is a confidante and sidekick of Sara Lance, the Canary (Caity Lotz). This version of the character is named Cindy, but is referred to as Sin for short. Debuting in "Broken Dolls", Sara apparently saved her from some men attacking her and that is how the two became friends. After Arrow asks Roy Harper to find the Canary, Roy uses a contact to lead him to Sin. After a chase Roy eventually finds the Canary, but is captured by her and Sin, whom they thought was sent by the League of Assassins but is later released after the Canary discovers that Roy is connected to the Queen family, and thus the vigilante realizes that Roy was sent by the Arrow. Sin is later shot at a Cash for Guns event by "The Mayor" in "Crucible" and Roy comes to her aid. The two remain friends and she comes to him for help in finding a friend who, it turns out, was murdered by Brother Blood in "The Scientist". She later appears in Thea's room after Roy was saved by Arrow from Blood and is the first person outside of Team Arrow to know Roy's new superstrength in "Blind Spot". She agrees to help him use it to protect the city and baits the "Starling Slasher" so that Roy can take him down. In the process Roy nearly kills him and when she tries to intervene he pushes her down. He immediately snaps out of it and at the hospital she comments on how they nearly killed him and how Roy lost control. In "Time of Death" Sin reunites with Sara after she returns and considers Sara to be her big sister. Sara has a flashback to the island and recalls when she, Oliver, and Slade Wilson witnessed a plane being shot down by Dr. Ivo. As the guys rush to get medical supplies, Sara stays with the pilot and he reveals himself to be Sin's father, and he asks Sara to watch over her, though the daughter being Sin isn't revealed until the present when Sara is looking at the picture that Sin's father gave her. Sara didn't reveal to Sin of the past connection with her father and his death, leaving her to believe that her father abandoned her. In "Seeing Red", Sin again encounters Roy completely under the influence of Mirakuru. She attempted to stop several people from attacking Roy, as they misinterpreted the situation. Roy then pushes Sin to the ground and later talks to Sara about his problematic behaviour. Sin returns in the season three episode "Uprising" where she, Black Canary, Arsenal, Wildcat and John Diggle face off against Danny Brickwell and his men. During that time she notices that Black Canary is not Sara (who is killed by Malcolm Merlyn in "The Calm") and informs about this to her father Quentin Lance. Sin later makes a cameo as one of many individuals associated with the Green Arrow over his career that give interviews for the true-crime documentary "Emerald Archer", in the episode of the same name.

References 

Black Canary characters
Characters created by Gail Simone
Comics characters introduced in 2006
DC Comics female characters
DC Comics martial artists
Fictional Chinese people